Achnahuaigh or Achinahuaigh (Scottish Gaelic: Achadh na h-Uamha) is a crofting hamlet and neighbourhood in the Melness area of Sutherland in the Highland council area in Northern Scotland. The hamlet is located on the minor road which passes though most of Melness including Talmine. North of the settlement, the road divides in two with one road continuing to Achininver and the other going to Midfield. Further north the Midfield spur has another road junction to Portvasgo. The settlement is located adjacent a small stream, Allt Achadh na h-Uaighe and some of its smaller tributaries all of which get their water from nearby Cnoc na Gobhar and Loch Vasgo. Achnahuaigh is located 71 metres above sea level and is surrounded by a few rural, small hiking trails

References 

Hamlets in Scotland
Populated places in Sutherland